John Hussey Hamilton Vivian, 4th Baron Swansea (1 Jan 1925 – 24 June 2005) was a British peer, sports shooter and lobbyist notable for his role in the debate over gun control in the United Kingdom.

He was educated at Eton College and Trinity College, Cambridge, where he graduated with a degree in French and German. He succeeded his father to the Barony in 1934 and took his seat in the House of Lords in 1956. He was Deputy Lieutenant for Powys in 1962. In 1966, Vivian, as Lord John Swansea, represented Wales in the Commonwealth Games, where he took Gold in the Full Bore Rifle event. He took a Silver in the same event at the 1982 Commonwealth Games in Brisbane.

Swansea was Vice-Chairman of the National Rifle Association. In this capacity he lobbied against legislation drawn in the aftermath of the Hungerford Massacre and the Dunblane Massacre, including a ban on the private possession of pistols. He did, however, support the banning of Kalashnikov rifles and a requirement for shotguns not in use to be locked up securely. He was captain of the House of Lords shooting team, which was forced to shut down after 80 years. Swansea resigned the Conservative whip and sat as a Crossbencher, before losing his place in the House as a result of the House of Lords Act 1999.

References

1925 births
2005 deaths
People educated at Eton College
Alumni of Trinity College, Cambridge
Welsh male sport shooters
Shooters at the 1966 British Empire and Commonwealth Games
Shooters at the 1982 Commonwealth Games
Commonwealth Games gold medallists for Wales
Commonwealth Games silver medallists for Wales
Commonwealth Games medallists in shooting
Conservative Party (UK) hereditary peers
Crossbench hereditary peers
People of the National Rifle Association
British male sport shooters
Swansea
Medallists at the 1966 British Empire and Commonwealth Games
Medallists at the 1982 Commonwealth Games